Trust the Saint is a collection of short stories by Leslie Charteris that originally appeared in The Saint Mystery Magazine and was first published in October 1962 by The Crime Club in the United States and by Hodder and Stoughton in the United Kingdom. This was the 35th book to feature the adventures of Simon Templar, alias "The Saint", and was published around the time the character began to receive wide recognition through the TV series The Saint starring Roger Moore as Templar.

Stories
The book consisted of 6 stories:

The Helpful Pirate
The Bigger Game
The Cleaner Cure
The Intemperate Reformer
The Uncured Ham
The Convenient Monster

Television adaptations
Two stories from this collection were later adapted as episodes of the 1962-69 TV series, The Saint.

"The Helpful Pirate" and "The Convenient Monster" aired back-to-back during the fifth season, airing on 28 October and 4 November 1966 respectively.

Reprints
 "The Convenient Monster" was one of a handful of stories in the Saint canon that crossed over into the realm of fantasy, and was reprinted in the December 1965 edition of The Magazine of Fantasy and Science Fiction.

1962 short story collections
Simon Templar books
Short story collections by Leslie Charteris
The Crime Club books